Jadu Heart is an English electronic music duo consisting of Diva-Sachy Jeffrey and Alex Headford.

Description
The duo is known for their conceptual storytelling through their characters (Jeffery as Dina and Headford as Faro) and their "theatrical" masks seen donned during their live performances and press runs.

The group formed as a result of a project assigned to Jeffery and Headford while studying at The British and Irish Modern Music Institute. The project, which tasked the class to depict a 'cycle' audibly, led Jadu Heart to create their first EP, Wanderflower. According to Jeffery, “Every song in our first EP corresponds to a different chapter in [Dina and Faro's] story.”

Discography

EPs
Wanderflower (2016)
Ezra's Garden (2016)

Albums
Melt Away (2019)
Hyper Romance (2020)
Derealised (2023)

References

External links
 

People from London
Musical groups from London
Musical groups established in 2016
Electronic dance music duos
2016 establishments in England